Wesley Wong (born 7 January 1987) is a Hong Kong actor and singer.

Background
His father is Melvin Wong, and his mother is Angie Chiu, both are Hong Kong TVB stars. His mother is famous for her elegance and femininity that does not age, and also has two other sons from her previous marriage.

Wesley Wong received his Bachelor's degree in Business Administration at University of Southern California and Master's degree in Acting at Beijing Film Academy.

Filmography

Film

References

Sources
Wesley Wong to star in new romance movie
Chinese Action Star Zhang Jin Joins ‘Pacific Rim 2’
Shyrley Rodriguez & Chinese Stars Added To ‘Pacific Rim 2’; Cole Sand Enrolls In ‘Magic Camp’
Angie Chiu’s Son, Wesley Wong To Star In $200 Million Movie
Jack Neo's new Ah Boys movie stars Hong Kong actor with famous parents
Famous parents, famous kids
Site is undergoing maintenance

External links

1987 births
Living people
Hong Kong male actors
Place of birth missing (living people)